The Ithaca City School District (ICSD) is a public school district centered in Ithaca, Caroline, Danby, and Enfield. Approximately 600 teachers work in the district, along with 300 other professional staff members, 275 paraprofessionals, and 40 administrators, including principals.

Administration
The district's central offices are located on the Ithaca High School campus at 400 Lake Street in Ithaca. The 2020-2021 budget is $136,842,648, with approximately 65.8% coming from property taxes.

Dr. Luvelle Brown began as superintendent on January 1, 2011.  He took over from Dr. Judith C. Pastel, who had been Superintendent of Schools since 1996. The district's administrative team now includes Lily Talcott, Deputy Superintendent; Robert Van Keuren, Director of Human Resources and Labor Relations; Amanda Verba, Chief Operations Officer; Mary Grover, Inclusion Officer; and Dr. Daniel Breiman, Administration Officer.

Dr. Sean Eversley Bradwell is the President of the Board of Education; Moira Lang is Vice-President. There are nine members of the Board of Education elected at-large for three-year terms. Current members (with term expiration dates in parentheses):

 Dr. Sean Eversley Bradwell (2023)
 Moira Lang (2024)
 Eldred Harris (2024)
 Erin Croyle (2025)
 Dr. Jill Tripp (2025)
 Christopher Malcolm (2023)
 Dr. Patricia Wasyliw (2023)
 Karen Yearwood (2025)

List of schools
High School (Grades 9-12):
Ithaca High School
Middle Schools (Grades 6-8):
Boynton Middle School
DeWitt Middle School
Alternative Secondary School (Grades 6-12):
Lehman Alternative Community School
Elementary Schools (Prekindergarten-5):
Belle Sherman Elementary School (founded in 1926 and named after Mary Isabella Sherman, a science and history teacher in Ithaca from 1875 to 1908)
Beverly J. Martin Elementary School (formerly Central Elementary, renamed Beverly J. Martin Elementary School in honor of a former student and principal in 1992)
Caroline Elementary School
Cayuga Heights Elementary School
Enfield Elementary School
Fall Creek Elementary School
Northeast Elementary School
South Hill Elementary School

References

Related links
 Frank David Boynton, Superintendent of Schools from 1900 to 1930
 Claude L. Kulp, Superintendent of Schools from 1930 to 1951

External links
 
 NYS Education Department listing of ICSD administrators

City School District
School districts in New York (state)
Education in Tompkins County, New York